The Committee for Adelaide is a membership-based organisation providing an independent voice for South Australia, committed to its namesake, Adelaide, the capital city of South Australia.
Its membership is made up of some of the most diverse and influential organisations in South Australia while its board includes professionals across numerous industries
The Committee for Adelaide's Chair is the Vice Chancellor and President of the University of South Australia, Professor David Lloyd and its Chief Executive Officer is Bruce Djite.

Purpose 
The Committee for Adelaide brings together businesses, industry bodies, community and government to shape the most liveable city in Australia and the third most liveable city in the world.

The Committee is non-partisan, independent and sector agnostic. Our membership is diverse and influential, making a significant contribution to the economy and society. Our members collectively employ over 30,000 South Australians and all have a clear and vested interest in our future.The Committee’s work centres around people, business and capital, and how the interconnection of these areas and their relationship to one another largely determine the economic and cultural health of our society.

History 
Established in 2013, the Committee for Adelaide is part of the Committees for Cities and Regions Network.
Its founding members are Ernst & Young and oil and gas company Santos Ltd and its foundation was influenced by political lobbyist, Ian Smith. 
Its inaugural Chair was Colin Goodall, a retiree from the oil and gas sector. He was replaced by James Blackburn, a partner with PwC in November 2017  and by Professor David Lloyd, the Vice Chancellor and President of the University of South Australia in August 2019.
The first General Manager of the Committee for Adelaide was Timothy Horton who was followed by Matt Clemow in 2014. The first full-time Chief Executive Officer of the Committee, Jodie van Deventer, began in September 2016.
At the time of her appointment, Ms van Deventer said the narrative around Adelaide needed to change for the city to grow.

Advocacy and Projects 
The Committee has worked on policies and initiatives to attract talent, business and capital. Some of the publications it has produced include:
	Inquiry into Migration in Regional Australia (2019)
       Vision for Adelaide (2019)  
	The Economic contribution of migration to South Australia (2019)
	University Merger submission (2018) 
	Shaping Adelaide’s Future (2016)
	Attracting the business we need (2014)
	Attracting the people we need (2013)
	Earning our place in a global economy (2013)

It has also prepared submissions into foreign policy white papers and infrastructure inquiries as well as given evidence at various parliamentary hearings

In 2017, it launched its business attraction project Boards without Borders and in 2019 launched its talent attraction program Adelaide Abroad, designed to attract skilled migrants and expats and make their transition back to Adelaide easier.

“This is about growing our population, creating new business and investment opportunities, creating a new narrative for the state and tapping into valuable international and interstate networks for the good of our city,” Committee for Adelaide chief executive officer Jodie van Deventer said at the time of the launch.

The Committee for Adelaide is often quoted by all forms of media and has had numerous opinion pieces published in various media including:
 	SA should race for next generation of motorsport  
 	How do you see Adelaide getting over this?  
 	Are we going to step up after COVID-19?  
 	Beyond the gloom, Adelaide has a chance to recreate itself  
 	The devastating truth about reconciliation  
 	SA has much to lose if submarine work goes west  
 	Defence can steer state into the future  
 	Adelaide is about the stories we tell ourselves  
 	South Australia needs policies to turbo charge population growth  
 	South Australia cannot lose its voice in Canberra because of poor population growth  
 	Bikes, electric scooters must be made legal for the road  
 	We need vibrant high-tech industry
Clock ticking on nuclear waste site debate

In 2020, the Committee for Adelaide hosted a workshop with the 50 most influential people in South Australia as identified by The Advertiser. This followed a call from one of the 50, Dr Sam Shahin from the Peregrine Corporation, for those on the list to use their influence for the good of the state.

Ten key ideas emerged with the Committee for Adelaide taking an active interest in energy, education, superannuation and a youth forum.
In 2017, the Committee for Adelaide made national headlines when it met with then Prime Minister Malcolm Turnbull regarding energy security, company taxation and migration.

Australian Financial Review journalist Phil Coorey, speaking on Adelaide radio station FIVEaa, said at the time that it was the Committee’s Canberra delegation – that included medium sized businesses – that had helped “take the sting” out of the company tax debate opening the way for Nick Xenophon MP to agree to cuts for businesses with turnover of up to $50 million. The deal included a $110 million loan for a massive solar thermal plant in South Australia and a study into constructing a long-mooted gas pipeline from the Northern Territory to South Australia.
In 2016, and following discussions with Kevin Scarce and the Nuclear Fuel Cycle Royal Commission, the Committee for Adelaide organised a delegation to visit several nuclear industrial facilities in Europe in April 2016.

According to Matt Clemow, the Committee's tour aimed to "create a cohort of SA people who have experienced the operations of the nuclear fuel cycle and will be able to contribute to the public discourse... We’ve had the view since before the announcement of the Royal Commission that it was very important the committee has a view on uranium and it’s settled. We went to the Royal Commission and said ‘How can we help?’ We were very clear if there was community interface that’s needed, we’re happy to play a part in that.”

InDaily reported that the delegation visited the Olkiluoto nuclear power plant and Onkalo spent nuclear fuel repository. 
The delegation returned to Adelaide a day before the Nuclear Fuel Cycle Royal Commission delivered its final recommendations to the Parliament of South Australia. On 6 May, spokespeople for the delegation expressed their support for the establishment of nuclear waste storage facilities in South Australia.

Membership 
The Committee for Adelaide has four different tiers of membership, Platinum, Corporate, Small Enterprise Member and Associate Member. All members are listed on our website :

Board Members

As of November 2020, the Committee's board membership includes:
 Professor David Lloyd (Chair)
 Alicia Genet (Deputy Chair)
 Trevor Cooke (Deputy Chair)
 Nicola Craven (Treasurer)
 Caillin Howard
 Alison Surjan 
 Morna Young

References

See also
Committee for Melbourne

2013 establishments in Australia
Organisations based in Adelaide
Political and economic think tanks based in Australia